Luverne was the marque of the Luverne Automobile Company, which produced automobiles from 1904 to 1917 in Luverne, Minnesota.

History 
Carriage makers Fenton and Edward Leicher, began in 1904 to build automobiles to order, in their coach-building factory. In 1903, they experimented with an automobile kit from A. L. Dyke in St. Louis. The first production automobile was a high-wheeler with a two-cylinder Buick engine. Rutenber and Beaver engines would be used in future production. In 1906 the Luverne Automobile Company was formally established.

Models 
In 1905 Luverne high-wheelers were joined by a conventional 20-hp touring car which lasted until 1909. A four-cylinder 40-hp model began production that year, and Luvernes entered the upscale automobile market.  The 4-cylinder Model Fifty became the Montana Special in 1912, when Luverne introduced their first six-cylinder car, the Model Sixty.

In 1913, the six-cylinder became the Big Brown Luverne model. This 60-hp Rutenber engine touring car on a 130-inch wheelbase, was painted "Luverne Brown" and had a solid German silver radiator. It was upholstered with "Old Spanish brown leather with all hair filling". In 1914 the Big Brown Luverne model was priced at $2,500,.

Fate 
Luverne production averaged 25 cars per year to 1908 followed by 50 cars per year to 1916. 25 Big Brown Luvernes were produce in 1917, and just 1 in 1918. Luverne built coachwork for professional cars on a limited basis and in 1912 entered truck production. Automobiles were discontinued in 1917 and the company was reorganized as the Luverne Truck Company. This company became Luverne Fire Apparatus, producing fire trucks and equipment into the 1970's.

Advertising 

Luverne advertising emphasized their strong construction and attractive wood coachwork. Advertising slogans included;
 Cars That Are Worth The Money
 The Best Investment in the Long Run
 They Look Good, They Are Good, and They Stay Good
 Strictly High Grade and Moderate in Price
 The Big Brown Luverne/Eventually You Will Want One
 Good for a Lifetime
 Cars With the Doubt Left Out
 They are Big and Long and Brown and Strong
 The Car for the Mountains

See also
 Brass Era car
 List of defunct United States automobile manufacturers
 Rock County Historical - Luverne Automobiles and Fire Apparatus
 Made in Minnesota - Old Cars Weekly
 Reviving a Luverne - Auto Restorer
 Big Brown Luverne by Harold E Glover - Chuck's Toyland

References 

1900s cars
1910s cars
Brass Era vehicles
Defunct motor vehicle manufacturers of the United States
Motor vehicle manufacturers based in Minnesota
Coachbuilders of the United States
Luxury vehicles
Highwheeler
Cars introduced in 1906
Vehicle manufacturing companies established in 1906
Vehicle manufacturing companies disestablished in 1917
Luxury motor vehicle manufacturers